Slobodan Janković (Serbian Cyrillic: Слободан Јанковић; born 23 December 1946) is a retired Serbian football midfielder who played for SFR Yugoslavia.

See also
List of NK Maribor players

References
Profile on Serbian federation site 
Just Sport Stats

1946 births
Living people
Serbian footballers
Serbian expatriate footballers
Yugoslav footballers
Yugoslavia international footballers
Association football midfielders
Yugoslav First League players
Ligue 1 players
NK Maribor players
Red Star Belgrade footballers
FK Sloga Kraljevo players
RC Lens players
NK Osijek players
Expatriate footballers in France